What About Now may refer to:

 What About Now (album), 2013 album by Bon Jovi
 "What About Now" (Daughtry song), 2008 Daughtry song also covered by Westlife
 "What About Now" (Lonestar song), 2000 Lonestar song
 "What About Now" (Robbie Robertson song), 1991 Robbie Robertson song